Powdery mildew is a fungal disease of barley caused by Blumeria graminis f. sp. hordei. The disease has a worldwide distribution and is most damaging in cool, wet climates. The host range of the form species hordei is restricted to barley and other Hordeum species.

Symptoms 
At first, powdery mildew can be observed as small greyish patches of fluffy fungal growth (mycelium) on the upper surface of the lower leaves. These spots resemble small cushions of white powder. Leaf tissue on the opposite side of an infected leaf turns pale green to yellow.  The fungus only infects the epidermal layer and can be easily scraped off with a fingernail. Infections can also occur on the leaf sheaths and ears.  Leaves remain green and active for some time following infection, then gradually become chlorotic and die off.  As the disease progresses, the mycelium often becomes dotted with minute black points (cleistothecia), which are the sexual fruiting bodies of the fungus.

The fungus does not kill the host plant as it requires the hosts' water and nutrients to grow. It settles on foliage and gradually slows the host growth process. Fruits, vegetables and flowers do not reach maturity if they become infected by powdery mildew. Flowers bloom is delayed or aborted. Vegetable and fruit crop yield is significantly lowered or the produce is of reduced quality.

Disease cycle 
The fungus overwinters as cleistothecia on straw, and in milder climates, also as mycelium and conidia on stubble and straw or volunteer barley and certain grasses.  Windborne ascospores or conidia are the primary inoculum (also known as the propagule) and can be dispersed over considerable distances. Infection by conidia requires high humidity, but not free water on the leaf surface.  Sporulation and spore dispersal are favored by drier conditions.  Thus the disease does well under alternating wet and dry conditions.  Production of conidia declines markedly as the colony ages. Cleistothecia develop on older leaves as the plant matures.  Low temperatures, together with the wetting of the cleistothecia for at least 72 hours, induces the maturations of the ascospores.  Ascospores are released following rains, but are relatively sparse in comparison to the condia.

References

External links

Extension publications 
 EPPO - Europe
 Europe: Scotland
 US: North Dakota
 US: Oregon
Fungal plant pathogens and diseases
Barley diseases